Tyrone Taylor (born November 13, 1970), better known by his stage name Sonny Seeza, or previously as Suavé and Sonsee, is an American hardcore rapper, record producer, DJ, actor, best known as a member of multi-platinum hardcore rap group Onyx.

Suave was discovered by Jam Master Jay of Run-D.M.C., who signed Onyx on his label JMJ Records. Onyx went on to release three top-selling albums and two commercially unsuccessful, before Sonny Seeza began his solo career. As a solo artist, Seeza released two albums, Tytanium and Bridges, and took part in recording various projects of other rap artists.

As a part of Onyx, Sonny Seeza released 5 albums and 20 singles, was nominated as "Rap/Hip-Hop New Artist" on American Music Awards of 1994 and won "Best Rap Album" on 1994 Soul Train Music Awards. During his career, Sonny Seeza has sold over 15 million albums and starred in two movies The Addiction and Ride.

Career

DJing
In 1982, Tyrone Taylor began in Brooklyn as a member of his older brother's hip-hop group, Cold Crash Scenes, performing with Killah Priest. Soon he began practicing DJing. In the future, his experience will be useful to him in recording the Onyx's second album All We Got Iz Us. Sonsee moved from Brooklyn to John Adams High School in 1985 and first met Fredro Starr and Big DS at the battle in Ajax Park (now called "Dr. Charles R. Drew Park") in Queens.

Onyx
In 1988, after graduating from school at the age of 17, Fredro Starr created the rap group Onyx along with his schoolmates Big DS and Suavé. Big DS came up with the name for the group, he named it after the black stone Onyx. They began to make the first demos in the basement of B-Wiz with drum machine beats from an SP-12."...B-Wiz was my producer when I was fifteen and sixteen, even. When all the other kids was getting turntables, he had an SP-12 [sampler]. He was one of the first niggas in the hood with a beat machine."

In 1989, Onyx signed Jeffrey Harris as their manager, who helped them secure a contract with the label Profile Records. In 1990, at York Studio in Brooklyn, they recorded their first single, "Ah, And We Do It Like This", which was released to low sales on April 25, 1990 on Profile.
"... That very first record was produced by a producer named B-Wiz. B-Wiz was the first producer of that record. He produced “Ah, And We Do It Like This,” and a lot of the original shit in like ’89, ’87, and ’88 for Onyx."

Jam Master Jay
Suave, Fredro Starr and Big DS met Jam Master Jay in a traffic jam at The Jones Beach GreekFest Festival on July 13, 1991. Jay give them about two months to get a demo, but Suave and Big DS couldn't make it to the studio as they were stranded in Connecticut. Onyx manager, Jeff Harris, later asked Fredro to come to the studio with his cousin, Kirk Jones (Sticky Fingaz) who, at the time, had a solo career under the name Trop. Jones, who was still in high school, would frequently cut class to work at a barber shop where he was reportedly making a thousand dollars a week. Fredro and Sticky Fingaz made two records, "Stik 'N' Muve" and "Exercise".
"...When we went to the studio we made two records. One was called 'Stick and Move' and the other was called 'Exercise'. And they both were crazy! When Jay heard the songs he was like, 'Yo, I love the group'." Sticky Fingaz would join Onyx as a full-time member after Jam Master Jay stated, “If Sticky ain't in the group, it ain't no group!”. Jay signed the group to his label, JMJ Records, for a single deal, followed by an EP deal. An album deal was later signed, due, in part, to the fact that the group managed to create 10 songs on a 6-song budget.

Def Jam years
In 1993, Onyx released their debut album entitled Bacdafucup. It proved to be a commercial success and eventually went multi-platinum, largely due to the well known single "Slam". Then Onyx released on JMJ Records another two albums: All We Got Iz Us and Shut 'Em Down.

Contribution
Tyrone Taylor came up with a merged spelling of the words "Bacdafucup", which the group members chose to name their debut album. The phrase "United States Ghetto" or shorty "U.S.G." was made up by him. Suave is the designer of one of the very first logos of the Onyx group, used by group in 1992. Sonny Seeza also created the names "Sticky Fingaz" and "Mickey Billy" for the characters of Kirk Jones and Fredro Starr for the song "Stik 'N' Muve".

Solo career
Sonny Seeza stopped touring with Onyx in 2009 to begin a solo career, but he still performs with other members of the group on big shows. He no longer participates in recording new songs with Onyx.

Seeza's debut album Tytanium was released through Iceman Music Group on May 19, 2009. He said the album "was more a double mix-tape with old and new songs. It wasn't what it set out to be. Due to company discrepancies and them dropping the ball, I pulled out".

In 2011 Sonny Seeza was flown to Switzerland by Soni Keomanyvong to do several live show performances around Switzerland. Later she became his booking agent, manager, and beloved girl. Then she introduced him to Mattieu Siegenthaler, who was interested in doing an album project with Sonny Seeza through his startup label Imprint, Empire Music. The first project he released on the new label Empire Music was a compilation CD The Billboard Blackmarket Mixtape. In 2012, Seeza founded his label Tytaynium Onyx. He released his second solo album Bridges on February 26, 2016.

Discography

Studio albums
 Tytanium (2009)
 Bridges (2016)

Compilation albums
 The Billboard Blackmarket Mixtape (2012)

Singles
 "Fire" / "Where You At" (as Sonsee from Onyx) (1998)
 "Doc Help" (2012)
 "We Can Due It" (2014)
 "Everywhere" (2016)

Awards and nominations

Filmography

Film
 The Addiction (1995) cameo appearance
 Ride (1998) as Tyrone "Son See" Taylor

Syndication

Video games
 Rap Jam: Volume One (1995) as Suave

References

External links
 Official website
 Sonee Seeza at Discogs
 
 Sonny Seeza at RapGenius

1970 births
African-American male rappers
Living people
Rappers from Brooklyn
Hardcore hip hop artists
21st-century American rappers
21st-century American male musicians
John Adams High School (Queens) alumni
21st-century African-American musicians
20th-century African-American people